Bring on the Girls may refer to:

 Bring On the Girls!, a story by P. G. Wodehouse
 Bring on the Girls (film), a 1945 American film